The Night of the Long Knives was a 1934 purge of political opponents in Nazi Germany.

Night of the Long Knives may also refer to:

Historical events
 Treason of the Long Knives or Night of the Long Knives, a legendary massacre of British chieftains by Saxons c. 460
 Night of the Long Knives (1962), a political purge in Britain
 Night of the Long Knives (1982), a meeting in the process of Canadian constitutional patriation
 Night of the Long Knives (1992), a Provisional IRA attack on the Irish People's Liberation Organisation

Music
 "Night of the Long Knives", a song by AC/DC from For Those About to Rock We Salute You
 "Night of the Long Knives", a song by Everything Everything from A Fever Dream
 "Night of the Long Knives", a song by Machine Head from Bloodstone & Diamonds
 "Night of the Long Knives", a song by Marduk from World Funeral
 "Night of the Long Knives", a song by Unisonic from Light of Dawn

Other uses
 "Night of the Long Knives", an episode of The Time Tunnel
 The Night of the Long Knives, a 1960 novella by Fritz Leiber
 "Night of the Long Knives", a stage in the Monte Carlo Rally